A Simple Heart is a 2008 French drama film directed by Marion Laine. It is an adaptation of one of Flaubert's Three Tales. The film was entered into the 30th Moscow International Film Festival where it won the Special Jury Prize. It won the Prix Jacques Prévert du Scénario for Best Adaptation in 2009.

Cast
 Sandrine Bonnaire as Félicité
 Marina Foïs as Mathilde Aubain
 Pascal Elbé as Théodore
 Patrick Pineau as Liébard
 Thibault Vinçon as Frédéric
 Noémie Lvovsky as Nastasie
 Michaël Abiteboul as Fabu
 Swann Arlaud as Paul Aubain

References

External links
 

2008 films
2008 drama films
Films based on works by Gustave Flaubert
French drama films
2000s French-language films
2000s French films